Morgan Farm is a census-designated place (CDP) in San Patricio County, Texas, United States. The population was 463 at the 2010 census. Prior to the 2010 census Morgan Farm CDP was known as Morgan Farm Area CDP.

Geography
Morgan Farm is located at  (28.009561, −97.545978).

According to the United States Census Bureau, the CDP has a total area of 3.3 square miles (8.7 km2), all land.

Demographics
As of the census of 2000, there were 484 people, 144 households, and 123 families residing in the CDP. The population density was 145.0 people per square mile (56.0/km2). There were 170 housing units at an average density of 50.9/sq mi (19.7/km2). The racial makeup of the CDP was 72.31% White, 4.96% African American, 0.41% Native American, 0.21% Pacific Islander, 19.01% from other races, and 3.10% from two or more races. Hispanic or Latino of any race were 61.78% of the population.

There were 144 households, out of which 44.4% had children under the age of 18 living with them, 64.6% were married couples living together, 15.3% had a female householder with no husband present, and 13.9% were non-families. 11.8% of all households were made up of individuals, and 4.2% had someone living alone who was 65 years of age or older. The average household size was 3.36 and the average family size was 3.65.

In the CDP, the population was spread out, with 33.9% under the age of 18, 12.0% from 18 to 24, 26.7% from 25 to 44, 21.1% from 45 to 64, and 6.4% who were 65 years of age or older. The median age was 30 years. For every 100 females, there were 102.5 males. For every 100 females age 18 and over, there were 102.5 males.

The median income for a household in the CDP was $48,500, and the median income for a family was $34,583. Males had a median income of $46,000 versus $21,354 for females. The per capita income for the CDP was $13,443. About 6.7% of families and 19.1% of the population were below the poverty line, including 35.2% of those under age 18 and 14.3% of those age 65 or over.

Education
Morgan Farm is served by the Sinton independent school District.

References

Census-designated places in San Patricio County, Texas
Census-designated places in Texas
Corpus Christi metropolitan area